Presented below is a list of search engine software.

Commercial

Free

See also 

 Search appliance
 Bilingual search engine
 Content discovery platform
 Document retrieval
 Incremental search
 Web crawler

 
Lists of software